These are the short track speed skating at the 2007 Canada Games events for the 2007 Canada Winter Games in Whitehorse, Yukon. For the long track events see speed skating at the 2007 Canada Winter Games.

500 metres

1000 metres

1500 metres

3000 metres

3000 metres Relay

References 

2007 Canada Winter Games
Canada 2007